John Howard Vaught (May 6, 1909 – February 3, 2006) was an American college football player, coach, and college athletics administrator.  He served as the head football coach at the University of Mississippi (Ole Miss) from 1947 to 1970 and again in 1973.

Born in Olney, Texas, Vaught graduated as valedictorian from Polytechnic High School in Fort Worth, Texas and attended Texas Christian University (TCU), where he was an honor student and was named an All-American in 1932. Vaught served as a line coach at the University of North Carolina at Chapel Hill under head coach Raymond Wolf from 1936 until 1941. In 1942, Vaught served as an assistant coach with the North Carolina Pre-Flight School.

After serving in World War II as a lieutenant commander in the United States Navy, he took a job as an assistant coach at Ole Miss in 1946 under Harold Drew, and replaced Drew as head coach a year later. He did not take long to make an impact, taking a team that had finished 2–7 and leading it to the first conference title in school history. He led the Rebels to additional Southeastern Conference titles in 1954, 1955, 1960, 1962, and 1963. To date, Vaught is the only coach in Ole Miss history to win an SEC football championship. He also dominated the Egg Bowl rivalry with Mississippi State, going 19–2–4 against the Bulldogs.

His 1960 team finished 10–0–1 and was the only major-conference team to go undefeated on the field that year.  As a result, it won a share of the national championship; it was awarded the Grantland Rice Award from the Football Writers Association of America after the bowl games.  In those days, the wire services crowned their national champion before the bowl games.  It is very likely that Ole Miss would have finished atop one poll, if not both, had they been taken after the bowl games as they are today. His 1962 team finished 10-0 and finished third in both polls; to date, it is the only undefeated and untied season in school history.

Vaught took Ole Miss to 18 bowl games, winning 10 times including five victories in the Sugar Bowl. Only two coaches held a winning record against Vaught: Paul "Bear" Bryant, with a record of 7–6–1 against Vaught, and Robert Neyland, with a record of 3–2.

Vaught suffered a mild heart attack on October 20, 1970. His longtime line coach, Bruiser Kinard, served as interim head coach for the remainder of the season, though Ole Miss credits the entire season to Vaught.

Vaught formally retired after the season. Billy Kinard, Bruiser's younger brother, succeeded him; he was appointed by his older brother, who had become athletic director. However, after a lackluster start to the 1973 season, Ole Miss fired Billy Kinard and demoted Bruiser Kinard. Vaught was named athletic director, and also served as interim head coach for the remainder of the 1973 season.

Vaught's overall record at Ole Miss was 190–61–12. His 190 wins are far and away the most in school history. When Vaught arrived, Ole Miss ranked 9th in all-time SEC football standings.  When he retired in 1970, Ole Miss had moved up to third, behind only Alabama and Tennessee. He was inducted into the College Football Hall of Fame in 1979. In 1982, Ole Miss honored Vaught by adding his name to Hemingway Stadium. On February 3, 2006, Vaught died at the age of 96 in Oxford, Mississippi.

Head coaching record

Notes

References

External links
 
 

1909 births
2006 deaths
American football guards
North Carolina Pre-Flight Cloudbusters football coaches
North Carolina Tar Heels football coaches
Ole Miss Rebels athletic directors
Ole Miss Rebels football coaches
TCU Horned Frogs football players
All-American college football players
College Football Hall of Fame inductees
United States Navy personnel of World War II
Players of American football from Fort Worth, Texas
People from Olney, Texas
United States Navy officers
Military personnel from Texas